Brazilian Sketches is an album by British saxophonist  Jim Tomlinson that was released in 2003. The album features Stacey Kent on vocals. The album contains cover versions of songs by Antonio Carlos Jobim, Vinícius de Moraes, Marcos Valle, and Luiz Bonfá.

Track listing

Personnel
 Jim Tomlinson – tenor saxophone
 Stacey Kent – vocals
 Colin Oxley – guitar
 John Pearce – piano
 David Newton – piano
 Simon Thorpe – double bass
 Chris Wells – drums

References 

2006 albums